Al Jazeera America News, also referred to as Al Jazeera America Newshour or simply (Weekend) News, is a news program that aired on Al Jazeera America. The program aired several times a day on Al Jazeera America and was supplemented with Newshour from Al Jazeera English. The two programs often shared international correspondents. The program, featured national, international news, weather, technology and sports reports, was known to carry more international news items per broadcast than any other domestic news program.

It aired largely in one-hour blocks at 7 pm Eastern/4 pm Pacific, 8 pm Eastern/5 pm Pacific and 10 pm Eastern/7 pm Pacific. 30 minute blocks aired around the clock at various other times. There was also a morning block from 8am until 12pm Eastern time. All news broadcasts were live, something largely uncommon among most U.S. cable news outlets.

It was modeled after Newshour on Al Jazeera English, however unlike its sister channel, all of Al Jazeera America's news broadcasts originated from New York.

Past Anchors

New York

Anchors
Jonathan Betz 
Richelle Carey
Imran Garda – fill-in anchor
Tony Harris 
Adam May – fill-in anchor
Antonio Mora
John Seigenthaler
David Shuster – fill-in anchor
John Henry Smith
Stephanie Sy - Morning News
 Del Walters - Morning News
Morgan Radford
Barbara Serra

Meteorologists
Nicole Mitchell – meteorologist

Other
Randall Pinkston – newsroom correspondent
Jacob Ward – science & technology

References

2013 American television series debuts
2016 American television series endings
Al Jazeera America original programming
2010s American television news shows
English-language television shows